Trust for London is an independent charitable foundation which aims to tackle poverty and inequality in London and its root causes. It was established in 1891 as the City Parochial Foundation and changed its name to Trust for London in 2010.

It achieves its aims by funding charitable work through its Central Fund, making substantial grants every year for the relief of poverty and inequality. As an independent funder it is particularly interested in work which is viewed as challenging. One of its long standing principles is to support activities which government will not or is unlikely to fund.

History
On 10 August 1878 a Royal Commission was established to investigate the parochial charities. It reported on 12 March 1880, which led to the City of London Parochial Charities Act 1883. This provided that the five largest parishes should continue to administer their own charitable endowments, but that the charities of the remaining 107 parishes (consisting of about 1,400 separate charitable gifts and bequests stretching back over 400 years) should be administered by a new corporate body officially called the Trustees of the London Parochial Charities. For most of its history it was known as City Parochial Foundation but since 2010 has been known as Trust for London.

A Central Governing Body (CGB) was established for the Trustees, consisting of 21 members, nominated by the Crown, the Corporation of the City of London, the London County Council, the Ecclesiastical Commissioners, the Senate of the University of London, the Councils of University College, London and King's College, London, the Council of the City and Guilds of London Institute, and the Governing Bodies of the Bishopsgate Foundation and the Cripplegate Foundation. There are now 17 members, mostly now nominated by the Trust itself, although some members are still nominated by London Councils, the Greater London Authority, the Church Commissioners, and the Corporation of the City of London.

The Trust assumed trusteeship of the City Church Fund, which held the ecclesiastical endowments. In 1899, it also assumed trusteeship of the Chelsea Physic Garden, which it held until 1983. In 1933, it also took over the People's Palace and Four Boroughs' Fund, in 1957 the new Sion Hospital (London) Charity, in 1966 the Whitley House Charity, and in 1982 the Ratcliff Fund.

References
City Parochial Foundation Report on Current Policy relating to Grants and Loans 1982–86, July 1982

External links
Trust for London website

Organisations based in the City of London
Religion in the City of London
1891 establishments in England
Charities based in London
Organizations established in 1891
Christianity in London